An Online Odyssey is a promotional-only EP released by British funk/acid jazz band Jamiroquai, released on 1 June 2001 in the United Kingdom in the Summer of 2001, to promote the launch of A Funk Odyssey as well as the band's new website. Around 10,000 copies of the album were pressed, with most being distributed in Britain. British copies of the album also featured a membership postcard for the group's official fan club at the time, "A Club Odyssey".

Track listing
 "Black Capricorn Day" (White Knights Remix) – 7:38
 "Snooze, You Lose" – 3:55
 "Black Capricorn Day" (Video) – 3:42

References

Jamiroquai compilation albums
2001 compilation albums